The administrative divisions of the German Democratic Republic (commonly referred to as East Germany) were constituted in two different forms during the country's history. The GDR first retained the traditional German division into federated states called Länder, but in 1952 they were replaced with districts called Bezirke. Immediately before German reunification in 1990, the Länder were restored, but they were not effectively reconstituted until after reunification had completed.

Division into Länder

General background

In May 1945, following its defeat in World War II, Germany was occupied by the United States, Britain, France and the Soviet Union. All four occupation powers reorganised the territories by recreating the Länder (states), the constituting parts of federal Germany. The state of Prussia, whose provinces extended to all four zones and covered two thirds of Germany, was abolished in 1947.

Special conditions were assigned to Berlin, which the four powers divided into four sectors. A united German state government existed in the city until it broke apart in 1948. After 1949, both West Berlin and East Berlin (officially only called Berlin) were in effect incorporated into the Federal Republic of Germany and the German Democratic Republic, respectively, despite not legally being part of these countries.

Länder in East Germany
In the Soviet occupation zone, five Länder were established which roughly corresponded to the preexisting states and provinces. (The territories east of the Oder–Neisse line had been transferred from the Soviet occupation zone to the Polish authorities as agreed upon at the Potsdam Conference.) The five states were:
Brandenburg was created out of the major part of the Prussian province of that name
Mecklenburg-Western Pomerania (Mecklenburg-Vorpommern) was created out of the state of Mecklenburg (reunited out of Mecklenburg-Schwerin and Mecklenburg-Strelitz only in 1934) and the Western parts of the Prussian province of Pomerania
Saxony (Sachsen) was augmented by the westernmost parts of the Prussian province of Lower Silesia. Also, the town of Reichenau was ceded to Poland.
Saxony-Anhalt (Sachsen-Anhalt) was created out of the most of the Prussian Province of Saxony and the Free State of Anhalt
Thuringia (Thüringen) was augmented by neighbouring parts from the Prussian provinces of Saxony and Hesse-Nassau.

In 1949, the Soviet occupation zone was transformed into the German Democratic Republic. The five Länder (and East Berlin, though the latter only with consultative votes) participated in the legislative branch through the Länderkammer (Chamber of States), which was elected by the Landtage (state parliaments). However, the Länder were not constituting entities forming a federal republic (as in West Germany) but rather decentralised administrative entities of a quasi-unitary state.

As a nod to the legal fiction that East Berlin was still occupied territory, it was counted neither as part of Brandenburg, nor as a state in its own right. East Germany claimed East Berlin as its capital, a status recognised by virtually all Eastern Bloc countries. However, the Western Allies (the US, UK, and France) never formally acknowledged the authority of the East German government to govern East Berlin; the official Allied protocol recognised only the authority of the Soviet Union in East Berlin in accordance with the occupation status of Berlin as a whole.

Division into Bezirke 

On 23 July 1952, a law combined the GDR's municipal districts (Kreise) into 14 regional districts (Bezirke), and subsequently, on 25 July 1952, the state governments transferred their administrative tasks to the new regional districts.

With this law, the Länder were in effect dissolved, and the GDR had become a highly centralized state. While they formally remained in existence, they no longer had any political or administrative functions, similar to the situation in Nazi Germany after 1934. The Bezirke were drawn without regard to the borders of the Länder and each named after their capitals, from north to south: Rostock, Neubrandenburg, Schwerin, Potsdam, Frankfurt (Oder), Magdeburg, Cottbus, Halle, Leipzig, Erfurt, Dresden, Karl-Marx-Stadt (named Chemnitz until 1953), Gera and Suhl.

The Länderkammer also remained in existence and its members were elected in 1954 by combined sessions of the Bezirkstage (district assemblies) in each Land and in 1958 directly by the Bezirkstage. However, on 8 December 1958, the Länderkammer and Länder were formally dissolved with no objections being raised by the Länderkammer.

Due to its special status, East Berlin was originally not counted as a Bezirk. In 1961, after the construction of the Berlin Wall, East Berlin came to be recognised in GDR administration as a 15th district, though it retained a special status until the adoption of the 1968 Constitution formally designated it as Bezirk Berlin.

The Bezirke (with the exception of East Berlin, which consisted of a single municipality) were subdivided into rural districts (Landkreise) and urban districts (Stadtkreise):

List of Bezirke 

From north to south, the Bezirke were:

*) The Bezirk Karl-Marx-Stadt was named Bezirk Chemnitz for a short period at both the beginning and end of the republic, corresponding with the renaming and reversal of the city Chemnitz. Between 10 May 1953 and 30 May 1990, both the city and Bezirk were named Karl-Marx-Stadt.
**) East Berlin was not officially a Bezirk, but from 1961 was provided with the function of one.

Reconstitution of the Länder 

On 23 August 1990 — just over a month before German reunification on 3 October — East Germany reconstituted the five original Länder. Legally, it was these Länder that then acceded to the Federal Republic of Germany.

In reality, the restored Länder did not fully reconstitute themselves until after reunification. On 14 October 1990, elections to the Landtage (state parliaments) were held in the five new states, initiating the formation of state governments.

Since changes to the boundaries of municipal districts were not reversed, and also due to considerations of expediency, the territorial make-up of the restored Länder differed somewhat from the borders before 1952.

Saxony and Saxony-Anhalt initially retained the rural and urban districts as administrative entities (Regierungsbezirke). Saxony-Anhalt later abolished them in 2003, while Saxony transformed them into directorates in 2008.

See also 
 List of leaders of administrative divisions of East Germany

References

External links 

 
German Democratic Republic

de:Bezirk (DDR)